Philip William Bates (16 November 1897 – 19 January 1974) was an English professional footballer who played as a centre half in the Football League for Crystal Palace.

Personal life 
Prior to the First World War, Bates worked in his family's greengrocer business. After the outbreak of the war in 1914, he attested in the Queen's Own (Royal West Kent Regiment) and gave his age as 19 years and 9 months, three years older than he was in reality. After a period training, Bates' battalion arrived on the Western Front in June 1915. He was wounded in the right arm in March 1916 and evacuated to Wharncliffe War Hospital in Sheffield. The resultant paralysis, caused by arthritis, led to Bates' discharge from the army later in the year. Despite the injury, he was able to return to work as a grocer and to football, though he was only able to play until he was forced into retirement in 1921. After the war, Bates married and established a grocer's in Beckenham. His business was damaged by a V-1 flying bomb during the Second World War. He died of lung cancer at Beckenham Hospital in 1974.

Career statistics

Honours 
Crystal Palace
 Football League Third Division: 1920–21

References 

1897 births
English footballers
English Football League players
British Army personnel of World War I
Queen's Own Royal West Kent Regiment soldiers
People from Penge
Association football wing halves
Crystal Palace F.C. players
Scunthorpe United F.C. players
Southern Football League players
1974 deaths
Midland Football League players
British grocers

Deaths from lung cancer in England
English disabled sportspeople
Child soldiers in World War I
Military personnel from London